Remnantz is a country house in Marlow in Buckinghamshire. It is listed Grade II* on the National Heritage List for England.

History
The main house was built around 1720 and was occupied by the Royal Military Academy, a facility conceived by Colonel John Le Marchant for training potential junior officers aged 13 to 18, from the Academy's formation in May 1802 until it moved to Sandhurst as the Junior Department of the Royal Military College, in 1811. A stable block, located a short distance south-east of the house, was built around that time. The house was acquired by Thomas Wethered, a brewer, in the first half of the 19th century and it was occupied by Lieutenant Commander Owen Wethered, High Sheriff of Buckinghamshire, in the 1960s. The family business was Thomas Wethered & Sons Ltd, a brewery which operated in Marlow from 1758 until it closed in 1988. Remnantz has been owned by the Bosley family since 2007.

References

Country houses in Buckinghamshire
Grade II* listed houses in Buckinghamshire
Houses completed in 1720
Marlow, Buckinghamshire